Kachug is the name of several inhabited localities in Russia.

Urban localities
Kachug, Irkutsk Oblast, a work settlement in Kachugsky District of Irkutsk Oblast

Rural localities
Kachug, Vologda Oblast, a village in Milofanovsky Selsoviet of Nikolsky District of Vologda Oblast